Ischnorhynchinae is a subfamily of seed bugs in the family Lygaeidae. There are about 16 genera and more than 70 described species in Ischnorhynchinae. The members of this subfamily are small, terrestrial insects that typically translucent or transparent plate-like structures covering the thorax (pronota) and tend to live in plant flowers.

Genera
These 16 genera belong to the subfamily Ischnorhynchinae:

 Acanthocrompus Scudder, 1958
 Caprhiobia Scudder, 1962
 Cerocrompus Scudder, 1958
 Congolorgus Scudder, 1962
 Crompus Stal, 1874
 Kleidocerys Stephens, 1829
 Koscocrompus Scudder, 1958
 Kualisompus Scudder, 1962
 Madrorgus Scudder, 1962
 Neocrompus China, 1930
 Neokleidocerys Scudder, 1962
 Oreolorgus Scudder, 1962
 Polychisme Kirkaldy, 1904
 Pylorgus Stal, 1874
 Rhiophila Bergroth, 1918
 Syzygitis Bergroth, 1921

References

Further reading

External links

 

Lygaeidae